The Saint Elias Mountains are a subgroup of the Pacific Coast Ranges, located in southeastern Alaska in the United States, Southwestern Yukon and the very far northwestern part of British Columbia in Canada. The range spans Wrangell-St. Elias National Park and Preserve in the United States and Kluane National Park and Reserve in Canada and includes all of Glacier Bay National Park in Alaska. In Alaska, the range includes parts of the city/borough of Yakutat and the Hoonah-Angoon and Valdez-Cordova census areas.

This mountain range is named after Mount Saint Elias, which in turn was named in 1741 by the Danish explorer Vitus Bering.

Geology
The St. Elias Mountains form the highest coastal mountain range on Earth. It formed due to the subduction of the Yakutat microplate underneath the North American Plate. The Yakutat plate is transported northwards along the active Fairweather Fault, which probably started more than 35 million years ago. Due to its thickness, the Yakutat plate is buoyant, resulting in surface uplift of the overriding North American plate, which formed the Talkeetna Mountains and the Alaska Range in Southcentral Alaska, located above the subducted part of the Yakutat plate.

The St. Elias Mountains formed at the plate boundary between the Yakutat and North American plates. The up-to--thick sediments that have been deposited on top of the Yakutat plate became imbricated and deformed as they were scraped off and compose today the southern (coastal) flanks of the St. Elias Mountains. In contrast the high elevated regions of the drainage divide (Bagley Icefield, Seward Glacier) and north of it are composed of rocks that are part of the North American plate.
The highest peaks of the St. Elias Mountains are located in the high ice field region of the Kluane National Park (Mount Logan, Mount Vancouver) and north of the Malaspina Glacier (Mount Saint Elias, Mount Cook), in the region known as the St. Elias syntaxis. At the syntaxis region the tectonic style changes from strike-slip motion along the Fairweather Fault to collision west of Malaspina Strait. This tectonic transition concentrates stress in the crust at the syntaxis that together with efficient glacial erosion results in positive feedback processes that through time forms extreme high mountain peaks and local relief, and rapid exhumation of rocks from up to 10 km depths to the surface.

Ranges 
The mountains are divided by the Duke Depression, with the shorter, more rounded Kluane Ranges to the east, and the higher Icefield Ranges to the west.  Sub-ranges of the Saint Elias include the Alsek Ranges, the Fairweather Range, and the Centennial Range.

Highest mountains 
The highest mountains of the range include:

Image

Notes

References

 
 
 

 
Landforms of Chugach Census Area, Alaska
Landforms of Copper River Census Area, Alaska
Mountains of Unorganized Borough, Alaska
Mountains of Yakutat City and Borough, Alaska
Wrangell–St. Elias National Park and Preserve